The 2004–05 Rochdale A.F.C. season was the club's 84th season in the Football League, and the 31st consecutive season in the fourth tier (now renamed as League Two). Rochdale finished the season in 9th place.

Statistics 
																												
				
				
				
				
				
				
				
				
				
				
				
				
				
				
				
				
				
				
				
				
				
				
				
				
				
				
				
				
				
				
		

|}

League Two

FA Cup

League Cup

League Trophy

References 

Rochdale A.F.C. seasons
Rochdale